The 2000 World Outdoor Bowls Championship women's triples was held in Moama, Australia, from 8 to 25 March 2000.

The gold medal was won by Sharon Sims, Anne Lomas and Patsy Jorgensen of New Zealand.

Section tables

Section A

Section B

Bronze medal match
 Australia bt  South Africa 28-11

Gold medal match
 New Zealand bt  England 18-12

References

Wom
World
Bow